List of Winchester Center Fire rifle cartridges. More commonly known as WCF, it is a family of cartridges designed by Winchester Repeating Arms Company. There are many other Winchester cartridges that do not carry the WCF moniker, such as the .300 WSM. .270 Winchester, and .300 Winchester Magnum

Cartridges
.22 WCF
.25-20 WCF - ".25 WCF"
.25-35 WCF
.30 WCF - ".30-30"
.32 Winchester Special - ".32 Special"
.32 Winchester Self-Loading - ".32 WSL"
.32 WCF - "32-20"
.32-40 WCF = ".32-40 Ballard"
.33 WCF
.348 WCF
.35 Winchester - ".35 Win"
.35 Winchester Self-Loading - ".35 WSL"
.351 Winchester Self-Loading - ".351 WSL"
.375 Winchester - ".375 Win"
.38-40 WCF 
.38-55 WCF - ".38-55 Ballard"
.38-56 WCF
.38-70 WCF
.38-72 WCF
.40-82 WCF
.40-110 WCF
.40-60 WCF
.40-65 WCF
.40-70 WCF
.40-72 WCF
.40-82 WCF
.405 WCF
.44-40 WCF
.45-60 WCF
.45-75 WCF
.45-90 WCF - ".45-90 Sharps"
.50-110 WCF
.50-95 WCF

See also
 List of cartridges by caliber
 List of handgun cartridges
 List of rimfire cartridges
 Cartridge (firearms)
 Table of pistol and rifle cartridges (by year)
 Winchester Short Magnum or WSM
 Winchester Super Short Magnum or WSSM

References

Winchester center fire
Cartridge families
Winchester Repeating Arms Company cartridges